Società Sportiva Dilettantistica Napoli Femminile, known as Napoli Femminile or simply Napoli, is an Italian women's football club from Naples that competes in Serie B.

History 
Founded as ASD Calciosmania Napoli, it took the name ASD Napoli Calcio Femminile in 2006 after merging with SSC Venus Napoli. In 2012 it reached the national cup's final, lost to ACF Brescia after extra time, and it attained promotion to Serie A for the first time. In 2017 the club merged with Napoli Dream Team and took the actual name.

After having won group D in Serie C, the club was in first position in Serie B when 2019–20 season was interrupted because of the restrictions related to the breakup of COVID-19 pandemic; the end standings were determined based on a corrective coefficient, resulting in a first place for Napoli Femminile and thus promotion to Serie A. In 2020–21 Serie A season the club ended in 10th position, avoiding the relegation in the last match of the championship. In 2021–22 Serie A season the club ended again in 10th position, but cannot avoid relegation in Serie B since the number of relegated club increased to have ten teams in the following season; relegation arrived in the last match of the season after losing against Pomigliano.

Current squad

See also 
 List of women's association football clubs
 List of women's football clubs in Italy

References

External links
Team profile at women.soccerway.com

S.S.D. Napoli Femminile
Association football clubs established in 2003
2003 establishments in Italy
Serie A (women's football) clubs